The 1960–61 Norwegian 1. Divisjon season was the 22nd season of ice hockey in Norway. Eight teams participated in the league, and Tigrene won the championship.

Regular season

External links 
 Norwegian Ice Hockey Federation

Nor
GET-ligaen seasons
1960 in Norwegian sport
1961 in Norwegian sport